Tristão Vaz Teixeira (c. 1395–1480) was a Portuguese navigator and explorer who, together with João Gonçalves Zarco and Bartolomeu Perestrelo, was the official discoverer and one of the first settlers of the archipelago of Madeira (1419–1420).

Biography
He was born Tristão Vaz, adding the name Teixeira after his marriage with Branca Teixeira.

Tristão was a nobleman of Prince Henry the Navigator's House, taking part in the conquest of Ceuta. Around 1418, while exploring the coast of Africa, he and João Gonçalves Zarco were taken off course by bad weather, and came upon an island which they called Porto Santo (Holy Harbor). Shortly after, they were ordered by Prince Henry to settle the island, together with Bartolomeu Perestrelo. Following a rabbit outbreak that made it difficult to grow crops, they moved to the nearby island of Madeira. It proved to be hospitable and cultivable, so Prince Henry sent for more settlers to colonize the island. The governance of Madeira was divided between Zarco and Tristão, who were appointed Captain-majors (capitães-donatários) of Funchal and Machico, respectively. Tristão was officially designated to the post on 11 May 1440.

Tristão Vaz took part in further raids and explorations along the coast of Africa throughout his life. He died at Silves,he was 85 years.

Notes

Sources

1395 births
1480 deaths
Portuguese explorers
Portuguese navigators
Portuguese nobility
Maritime history of Portugal
History of Madeira
15th-century explorers
15th-century Portuguese people